Kobayashi's bat (Eptesicus kobayashii) is a species of bat. The species is found only on the Korean Peninsula; it has been suggested that it may be a local form of Eptesicus bottae, Botta's serotine.

References

Mammals of Korea
Bats of Asia
Eptesicus
Mammals described in 1928
Taxobox binomials not recognized by IUCN